Telicota eurotas, the sedge darter,  is a butterfly of the family Hesperiidae. It is found in Australia (the north-eastern coast of Queensland), the Aru Islands, Irian Jaya, Maluku and Papua New Guinea.

The wingspan is about 30 mm.

The larvae feed  on various sedges, including Carex polyantha, Cladium procerum, Scleria ciliaris, Scleria polycarpa and Scleria sumatrensis. It lives in a shelter made from leaves of the hostplant joined with silk.

Subspecies
Telicota eurotas eurotas (Ambon, Maluku, Indonesia, Papua New Guinea)
Telicota eurotas laconia Waterhouse, 1937 (north-eastern coast of Queensland)

External links
Australian Insects
Australian Faunal Directory

Taractrocerini
Butterflies described in 1860